C.P.O. Sharkey is an American sitcom television series, created by Aaron Ruben, that aired on NBC from December 1, 1976, to April 28, 1978. The series starred Don Rickles in the title role, with Peter Isacksen, Elizabeth Allen, Harrison Page, and Richard X. Slattery featured in the cast.  Rickles, who actually served in the Navy during World War II, was already well known for the indiscriminate insult comedy he used in his stand-up routines and in guest appearances on other TV shows and specials. C.P.O. Sharkey was the third TV series that provided him with a regular vehicle for his coarse humor. (Two previous series in which he starred, both eponymously titled The Don Rickles Show—one a 1968 variety show, the other a 1972 sitcom—each aired for one season.) Coincidentally, Rickles portrayed a different C.P.O. in the 1961 episode "Professional Sailor" of the CBS military sitcom/drama, Hennesey, starring Jackie Cooper.

Premise
Don Rickles is U.S. Navy Chief Petty Officer Otto Sharkey, an abrasive career Navy man stationed at a San Diego naval base, in charge of Company 144, a group of seaman recruits. Sharkey initially comes off as callous, sarcastic and insulting to everyone around him, but underneath his harsh exterior he genuinely cared for his men and often went to great measures to help with their problems.

Members of Company 144 were a motley mix of ethnicities, including:
Seaman Lester Pruitt (Peter Isacksen), Sharkey's assistant, a tall, lunkheaded Southerner who often shared his homespun homilies with the uninterested Sharkey.
Daniels (Jeff Hollis), a hip Black
Kowalski (Tom Ruben), who was Polish
Skolnick (David Landsberg), a Jewish New Yorker
Mignone (Barry Pearl), an Italian
Rodriguez (Richard Beauchamp), a Puerto Rican
Shimokawa (Evan C. Kim), a Japanese immigrant

Others on the base included:
C.P.O. Dave Robinson (Harrison Page), Sharkey's colleague and closest friend on the base.
Lieutenant Whipple (Jonathan Daly), Sharkey's immediate superior, whose complacency and buck teeth were fodder for Sharkey, though for obvious reasons he never insulted Whipple to his face.
Captain Quinlan (Elizabeth Allen), the newly appointed female base commander during season 1, who Sharkey had a hard time accepting at first.
Captain Buckner (Richard X. Slattery), who replaced Quinlan in season 2. A former submarine commander and hard-nosed career man, Buckner usually got right in Sharkey's face and barked orders in a rapid-fire manner, rendering Sharkey unable to respond except in a civil manner.
Seaman Apodaca (Phillip Simms), who joined the base in season 2.

Running gags and precedents
In the earliest episodes of the series, Sharkey would often end conversations with each of his recruits by giving them the evil eye and saying "I'm gonna keep an ey-y-y-e on you".

(The July 9–16, 1977 cover of TV Guide showed Rickles and Isacksen in character, with Sharkey standing on a foot locker so he could physically be eye-to-eye with a surprised Pruitt.) Some of Sharkey's insults toward Pruitt included:

"Why don't you put bicycle pedals in your ears and ride yourself outta here!"
"Why don't you go elope with a moose!"
"The last time I saw a head like that was on a wall over a bar in Teaneck, New Jersey!  Ya big dummy!!"

Lt. Whipple would often lecture Sharkey. When he left the room (after bellowing "Carry on!" in his piping voice), Sharkey would often look in the camera and imitate Whipple's buck-teeth. He referred to him as Lieutenant Bugs Bunny. 

The series was the first prime-time sitcom to depict the burgeoning punk rock music scene, with The Dickies, a band from the San Fernando Valley, making a guest appearance in season 2.

The Tonight Show cigarette box incident
CPO Sharkey is peripherally remembered for an incident that occurred when Rickles was a guest on The Tonight Show on December 13, 1976, during which he broke Johnny Carson's wooden cigarette box, an heirloom that Carson had kept on his desk since 1967.  Rickles pretended to be an immigration agent while joking with guest host Bob Newhart, using the cigarette box as a rubber stamp, slamming it down on the desk several times and accidentally breaking the lid in two. Upon seeing what he had done, Rickles went into mock panic.

Carson returned to the show the following night and promptly discovered the broken box still sitting on his desk while conversing with bandleader Doc Severinsen, who was sitting in for Ed McMahon. After he was told that the broken box was Rickles' doing, Carson took a camera crew, walked across the hallway to the adjacent studio where CPO Sharkey was being recorded, and interrupted the taping in order to tease Rickles, all to the delight of the studio audiences of both shows. Carson mocked Rickles' comedic style, calling him a "big dummy," and also teased actor Harrison Page, speaking to him in an exaggerated jive accent. As Carson prepared to exit, Rickles announced Carson to his own audience. Carson then mockingly glared at Rickles, shouted: "They know who I am!" and playfully slapped his face before leaving.

Two years later on November 13, 1978, nearly seven months after CPO Sharkey had been cancelled, Rickles, this time guest-hosting The Tonight Show while talking with guest Carroll O'Connor, inattentively started slamming Carson's new cigarette box on the desk, but immediately stopped when he realized what he was doing; this time the box remained intact.

The original incident was often replayed in Tonight Show retrospectives and was considered a major highlight of the 1970s era of the show. The incident was also featured in Mr. Warmth: The Don Rickles Project.  In a 2005 interview with The New York Times, Rickles said that the incident was a genuine accident, but he and Carson played up the drama. "Knowing Johnny, he milked it a little bit. And I added to it." He also said he had no idea that Carson would barge in on his set that day. "I was really taken. In those days, those were bigger cameras than they are today. To schlep all that stuff into the other studio was quite an event."

Broadcast history

Reruns
Reruns aired on Ha!, which became Comedy Central, in the early 1990s. C.P.O Sharkey is currently available on Tubi.

Home media
On May 19, 2015, Time Life released C.P.O. Sharkey – The Complete Season 1 on DVD in Region 1.

On September 22, 2015, Time Life released C.P.O. Sharkey – The Complete Season 2 on DVD in Region 1.

Episodes

Season 1 (1976–77)

Season 2 (1977–78)

References

Further reading
 Brooks, Tim; Earl Marsh (2003). The Complete Directory to Prime Time Network and Cable TV Shows. Ballantine Books. .

External links
 

1976 American television series debuts
1978 American television series endings
1970s American sitcoms
NBC original programming
Military comedy television series
Television shows set in San Diego
English-language television shows